Henning Christensen (9 May 1918 – 16 November 1973) was a Danish sailor. He competed in the 5.5 Metre event at the 1952 Summer Olympics.

References

External links
 

1918 births
1973 deaths
Danish male sailors (sport)
Olympic sailors of Denmark
Sailors at the 1952 Summer Olympics – 5.5 Metre
People from Vejen Municipality
Sportspeople from the Region of Southern Denmark